Leon de Modena or in Hebrew name Yehudah Aryeh Mi-Modena (1571–1648) was a Jewish scholar born in Venice to a family whose ancestors migrated to Italy after an expulsion of Jews from France.

Life
He was a precocious child and grew up to be a respected rabbi in Venice. However, his reputation within traditional Judaism suffered for a number of reasons, including an unyielding criticism of emerging sects within Judaism, an addiction to gambling, and lack of stable character. As Heinrich Graetz points out, this last factor prevented his gifts from maturing: "He pursued all sorts of occupations to support himself, viz. those of preacher, teacher of Jews and Christians, reader of prayers, interpreter, writer, proof-reader, bookseller, broker, merchant, rabbi, musician, matchmaker and manufacturer of amulets." One of his students was Azaria Piccio, with whom he would later be intellectually close.

Though he failed to rise to real distinction, Leon of Modena earned a place in Jewish history in part by his criticism of the mystical approach to Judaism. One of his most effective works was his attack on the Kabbala (first published in 1840). In it, he attempted to demonstrate that the "Bible of the Kabbalists" (the Zohar) was a modern composition. He also writes that the name "" (the wisdom of Kabbalah) is misleading, since it is neither "wisdom" nor a Kabbalah (a tradition going back to Moses) but a mere fabrication. He became best known, however, as the interpreter of Judaism to the Christian world.

He wrote an autobiography entitled  literally "the life of Judah". In this highly candid and sometimes emotional work, he admitted to being a compulsive gambler. He also mourned his children (two of whom died in his lifetime - one from natural causes and one killed by gangsters). Another son was a ne'er-do-well who traveled to Brazil and returned to Venice only after his father's death.

At the behest of an English nobleman, Leon prepared an account of Jewish customs and rituals,  (1637). This book was the first Jewish text addressed to non-Jewish readers since the days of Josephus and Philo. It was widely read by Christians, rendered into various languages, and in 1650 was translated into English by Edmund Chilmead. At the time, the issue of whether Jews should be permitted to resettle in Britain was coming to the fore (See Resettlement of the Jews in England), and Leon of Modena's book did much to stimulate popular interest. He died in Venice.

Among his deepest interests was music. He served as cantor at the synagogue in Venice for more than forty years. Earlier, he is believed to have introduced some sort of polyphony in the synagogue at Ferrara, and wrote two essays on music justifying polyphonic practice in services and celebrations. Modena was certainly a musician and a friend of Salamone Rossi; it is not clear whether he was also a composer.

He wrote calling for radical religious reform. In his "Bet Yehudah," Leon went no further than to show his preference for religious reform; but he attacked traditional Judaism in a pseudonymous work entitled "Ḳol Sakal."

Writings
Magen VaHerev (Hebrew מגן וחרב "Shield and Sword") is a polemic attack upon Christian dogmas. In Magen VaHerev Leon Modena takes to task Christians for their interpretations of Hebrew scriptures and refutes the claims of Jesus.

His written works include:
She'elot uTeshuvot Ziqnei Yehudah (Collected Responsa, Mossad HaRav Kook ed. Shelomo Simonson, 1956 )
Beit Lechem Yehudah (Anthology of statements of Hazal organized by topic, Venice, 1625  and Prague, 1705 
Diwan (Collected Poems, JTS Publications, ed. Shimon Bernstein, 1932 
Ari Nohem (See above)
Kitvei Y. A. Modena (Letters and musings, ed. Yehuda Blau, Budapest, 1906)
Magen VeTzinah (Responsa, ed. A. Geiger, Breslau, 1857)
Tzemach Tzadiq (Ethical Treatise: a recent translation into English of this work is now available on the Web)
Lev HaAryeh (Monograph on Memory improvement and Mnemonics, in which he greatly extols the use of the method of loci )
Sur MeRa (A philosophical dialogue on gambling, written at the age of 13, Amsterdam 1692 , Vilna 1896 
Historia de' riti hebraici (See above, translated into Hebrew by Shelomo Rabin, Vienna, 1867 )
Pi HaAryeh (Italian-Hebrew dictionary of all difficult words in Tanakh), Venice 1640 
HaBoneh, commentary on Ein Yaakov; pub. Venice 1635, and reprinted with Ein Yaakov itself since 1684.

Appearances in popular culture
Leon of Modena is the basis of the character Judah Aryeh in the novel People of the Book by Geraldine Brooks.

Leon of Modena is depicted in a children’s book called The Painter and the Rabbi, it depicts an alleged relationship Leon had with the noted painter Tintoretto. The book is based on stories told by docents at Jewish Museum of Venice, although there is no proof of said relationship, there is certainly mythology about it. Published by Kalaniot Books, 2021, written by Shoshana Weiss and illustrated by Jennifer Kirkham.

References

Bibliography
 H. Graetz, History of the Jews (Eng. trans.), vol. v. ch. iii
 Jewish Encyclopedia, viii. 6
 Geiger, Leon de Modena
 The Autobiography of a Seventeenth-Century Venetian Rabbi: Leon Modena's Life of Judah. Trans. and ed. Mark R. Cohen. Princeton, 1988.
 Yaacob Dweck, The Scandal of Kabbalah: Leon Modena, Jewish Mysticism, Early Modern Venice. Princeton, N.J: Princeton University Press, 2011.
 Tohar Vered. "The Hebrew moral book 'Zemach Zadick': Between two worlds", in: Religious Stories in Transformation: Conflict, Revision and Reception, Houtman Alberdina, Kadari Tamar, Poorthius Marcel and Tohar Vered (eds.). Leiden: Brill 2016, pp. 353–375.

External links
 
 

17th-century Republic of Venice rabbis
1571 births
1648 deaths
Jewish apologists
Jewish merchants
Jewish skeptics
Religious leaders from Modena